= Nikbakht =

- Nikbakht
- Born: Around 1973/1974; Kabul, Afghanistan
- Died: February 26, 2024
- Known for: Being imprisoned for twenty-five years by family members

Nikbakht was an Afghan woman who had been imprisoned for about 25 years in a dark and dilapidated room in the city of Kabul, the capital of Afghanistan, by her brothers. She was rescued in 2023 by security forces affiliated with the Taliban administration and was transferred to Kabul's Wazir Akbar Khan Hospital for treatment.

== Background ==
Nikbakht, who was around fifty years old at the time of her rescue, had married many years earlier and, after separating from her husband, had returned to her brothers’ home. According to police statements, due to family disputes and incompatibility with the wife of one of her brothers, she was severely abused and kept in domestic confinement by them. Throughout this period, she lived in a room of about ten square meters without access to sunlight.

== Rescue operation ==
On 24 September 2023, Nikbakht's neighbors, after noticing signs of her presence in the house, informed the police of the Chahar Qala-e Wazirabad area. After receiving the report, Taliban security forces took action and rescued Nikbakht from a dark and contaminated room.

Abdul Rahim Ajmal, the police chief of Kabul's District Ten, stated that four of Nikbakht's brothers were arrested following the incident. According to him, the room where she had been kept was in extremely poor condition; its floor was covered with trash and feces, and its ceiling was covered in cobwebs. Her family used a small hole under the window to give her food, and she had not bathed for years, living only in old, worn-out clothes.

== Post-rescue condition ==
After being rescued, Nikbakht was transferred to Kabul's Wazir Akbar Khan Hospital and placed under immediate medical care. According to the doctors, she arrived with severe malnutrition and physical weakness, and she was unable to speak or move. Roya Behzad, one of the hospital's physicians, stated that after several days of treatment, Nikbakht's condition gradually improved, and she became able to speak and eat.

Khadem Hussain Hosseini, the local community elder, stated that Nikbakht's family had no contact with other residents of the neighborhood, and people were unaware of her condition. He added that the situation was first discovered when children, during play, mentioned the presence of a “madwoman” in the house, which led to the revelation of the case. Ghulam Sakhi, one of Nikbakht's brothers and one of those responsible for her prolonged confinement, expressed remorse in interviews with the media.

== Death ==
On 26 February 2024, Nikbakht died from illness at her home in Kabul. Khalid Zadran, spokesperson for the Taliban police, stated that she had been under treatment for some time and her condition was improving, but she suddenly deteriorated and passed away.
